The Town of  Berthoud is a Statutory Town located in Larimer and Weld counties, Colorado, United States. The town population was 10,332 at the 2020 United States Census with 10,071 residing in Larimer County and 261 residing in Weld County.

History
White settlers first came to the present-day Berthoud area in the early 1860s, following the Colorado Gold Rush. Many settlers filed homestead claims, but most bellied up and left the valley to hardier souls who ranched and farmed the arid prairie that straddled the river bottom.

In 1872, a miner-turned-rancher from Central City, Colorado, Lewis Cross, staked the first homestead claim where the Colorado Central Railroad planned to cross Little Thompson creek. When the tracks were laid through the valley in 1877 a depot, section house, and water tank were installed at this strategic site. The tiny settlement known as Little Thompson was renamed Berthoud in honor of Edward L. Berthoud, who had surveyed the rail route through the valley.

Over the next few years the settlement grew to include a handful of homes, a blacksmith shop, a mercantile store, a small grain elevator, and a log cabin that served as school and church for the community.

In the early 1880s, the Colorado Central Railroad recognized that Berthoud's location on the river bottom caused their steam-powered locomotives to labor excessively to ascend the grade out of the valley. At their urging, during the winter of 1883–84, several buildings of the town were loaded on wheels and pulled by teams of draft animals to the town's present-day location on the bluff one mile (1.6 km) north of the river.

Agriculture in the Berthoud area flourished. Farmers diverted water from the Little and Big Thompson Rivers into a network of reservoirs and ditches that allowed the arid uplands to be irrigated. Harvests of alfalfa, sugar beets, wheat, corn, and barley were sold on the open market or used to fatten pens of sheep and cattle. The town grew as merchants and shopkeepers set up businesses to serve farmers and ranchers from the nearby countryside.

In 1886, the Welch Addition doubled the size of the Berthoud as town boundaries extended south beyond present-day Mountain Avenue for the first time. A year later a hose company was hastily formed to protect the town from fire after the Davis & Hartford Mercantile store burned to the ground. In 1888 a town board was elected and within a short time they hired a marshal to keep the peace and light the street lamps. By the early 1900s, Berthoud sported a business district on Third Street and Massachusetts and Mountain Avenues.

In the 1920s Mountain Avenue became part of a paved state highway system which would become U.S. Highway 287 connecting the larger towns of northern Colorado.  In 2007, Highway 287 was rerouted to the north and west of Berthoud, bypassing downtown Berthoud and eliminating Mountain Avenue from the highway route.

In October 1941, Berthoud opened the sugar beet harvest. In the area surrounding Berthoud beets were harvested to be processed in Loveland, Colorado, to the north. According to the Berthoud historical society, "Berthoud growers delivered beets to several rural dumping stations where the beets were loaded into boxcars and hauled to sugar factories in nearby Loveland and Longmont." This industry relied both on WWII German Prisoners of War as well as migrant farm workers from Mexico.

On June 25, 2019, Berthoud became the only municipality in Colorado to ban the sale of puppy mill dogs.

Geography
Berthoud is located at  (40.284667 -104.965504).

At the 2020 United States Census, the town had a total area of  including  of water.

Demographics

According to the 2010 census, there were 5,105 people and 1,999 households residing in the town.

The population density was 446.7 people per square mile. The racial makeup of the town was 93.1% White, 0.2% African American, 0.9% Native American, 1.0% Asian, 0.2% Pacific Islander, and 2.1% from other races. Hispanic or Latino of any race were 8.6% of the population.

There were 1,999 households, out of which 34.6% had children under the age of 18 living with them, 52.9% were married couples living together, 9.6% had a female householder with no husband present, and 32.1% were non-families. 27.0% of all households were made up of individuals, and 8.8% had someone living alone who was 65 years of age or older. The average household size was 2.52 and the average family size was 3.07.

The town's population was spread out, with 25.4% under the age of 18, 7.2% from 18 to 24, 23.2% from 25 to 44, 31.9% from 45 to 64, and 12.3% who were 65 years of age or older. The median age was 41.2 years. For every 100 females, there were 101.0 males. For every 100 females age 18 and over, there were 96.7 males.

The median income for a household in the town was $70,292. Males had a median income of $43,676 versus $29,861 for females. The per capita income for the town was $28,111. About 4.4% of the population were below the poverty line.

Town government 
Berthoud is a statutory town with a mayor-council form of government. The Board of Trustees includes all at-large elected positions serving for four-year terms and is made up of the mayor and six trustees. The board is charged with setting policy, passing the budget and creating the overall vision for the town of Berthoud.

The mayor has the same voting rights as all other trustees and is responsible for presiding over town board meetings. This position is recognized as the town government leader for all ceremonial purposes. The Board of Trustees elects, by majority vote, a mayor pro tem, who is expected to perform responsibilities of the mayor when the mayor is absent or unable to perform their duties.

The Board of Trustees meets regularly on the second and fourth Tuesday of each month and may schedule additional special meetings as needed. All meetings are open to the public and subject to Colorado Open Meeting Laws.

Town committees and commissions 
 Historic Preservation Advisory Committee
 Parks, Open Space, Recreation & Trails Committees
 Planning & Zoning Commission
 Tree Advisory Committee
 Youth Advisory Commission

Police department 
The Town of Berthoud contracts with the Larimer County Sheriff's Office for law enforcement services. The contract provides one sergeant and five deputies to provide patrol services for the town with support from all other divisions of the Sheriff's Office. Two deputies are assigned as school resource officers.

Transportation 
Berthoud Area Transportation Service (BATS) is the main transit system in Berthoud and provides door-to-door service rides within Berthoud, as well as trips to Loveland and Longmont. BATS is open to the public and is operated through the town. The service receives funding from the town of Berthoud, the Larimer County Office on Aging and the city of Fort Collins.

FLEX is a regional bus route that serves the communities of Fort Collins, Loveland, Berthoud, Longmont, and Boulder. This service is operated by Transfort and is made possible through regional partnerships.

Community and culture
Berthoud is a small town surrounded largely by farmland, nicknamed the "Garden Spot of Colorado". Berthoud is known for its small-town feel, abundance of trees and open space, mountains views and a great location northern Colorado.

Parks and recreation 
Berthoud has a total of eleven parks, developed and undeveloped, which include a skate park, baseball fields, soccer fields, outdoor basketball courts, sand volleyball courts, and pickleball courts. The town finished the Berthoud Recreation Center at Waggener Farm Park in 2021 which contains an aquatic center (pool, water slide, lazy river, hot tub/spa), basketball courts, volleyball courts, pickleball courts, a walking track and a climbing wall. The town also offers a wide variety of programs for youth and adults in the community.

Berthoud has been a Tree City USA for 33 years.

Local parks 
 Bein Park
 Bein Baseball Complex
 Collins Park
 Dog Park
 Fickel Park
 Hillsdale Park
 Pioneer Park
 Railroad Park
 Roberts Lake
 Skate Park
 Town Park

Annual events 
Berthoud is home to several annual events organized and sponsored by various organizations.
 Berthoud Day – first Saturday in June
 Oktoberfest – first Saturday in October
 Arbor Day Celebration
 Berthoud Sunfest - Home of the Outdoor Quilt Show - Art Market - June
 Berthoud Open Golf Tournament
 Local farmers market held every Saturday throughout the summer
 Berthoud Snowfest - sanctioned Colorado Snow Sculpting Competition - December

Museums 
The Berthoud Historical Society manages two museums in the community: the Little Thompson Valley Pioneer Museum and the McCarty-Fickel Home.

Little Thompson Valley Pioneer Museum 
Located in A.G. Bimson's historic blacksmith shop and Elmer Carlson's garage building, the Little Thompson Valley Pioneer Museum brings Berthoud's heritage to life. An array of exhibits reveals the town and surrounding rural districts as a bustling agricultural center of Colorado since the 1880s.

Originally built in 1893 and listed on the National Register of Historic Places, Bimson's Stone Shop also serves as the gateway to museum grounds that feature unique exhibits and comfortable gathering places.

McCarty-Fickel Home 
An elegant residence erected in 1916 by Dr. and Mrs. D.W. McCarty, the McCarty-Fickel Home is the setting of a historic house museum that explores the domestic, professional and civic lives of members of the McCarty and Fickel families from the 1890s to the present, including the onsite medical office from the 1930s.

Designed by noted Colorado architect Glenn Huntington, the home was constructed in the Denver Square architectural style and still contains original woodwork, numerous family artifacts and original furnishings purchased from the Daniels and Fisher department store in Denver.

Arts and culture 
Wildfire Community Arts Center is a local non-profit grassroots organization which provides classes, events, music, art and community celebrations to support art in Berthoud. The Berthoud Dance Company is the local community dance company.

Schools and education 
Students from the area attend the four public schools which are part of the Thompson School District: two elementary schools (Berthoud Elementary and Ivy Stockwell), a centrally located middle school (Turner Middle School), and a high school (Berthoud High School).

Berthoud is located about 35–40 minutes from Colorado State University in Fort Collins, the University of Colorado at Boulder, the University of Northern Colorado in Greeley, Front Range Community College and Aims Community College. These higher education options provide advanced training, research and career placement assistances for students and graduates.

Notable people
 Tyler Carron - American ice sled hockey player
 Nikko Landeros - American ice sled hockey player and skier
 Eric Conn - American biochemist
 Rennie Davis -  American anti-war activist 
 Gerry Shishin Wick - Soto Zen roshi and abbot of Great Mountain Zen Center in Berthoud

See also

Colorado
Bibliography of Colorado
Index of Colorado-related articles
Outline of Colorado
List of counties in Colorado
List of municipalities in Colorado
List of places in Colorado
List of statistical areas in Colorado
Front Range Urban Corridor
North Central Colorado Urban Area
Fort Collins, CO Metropolitan Statistical Area
Greeley, CO Metropolitan Statistical Area

References

External links

Town of Berthoud official website
Berthoud Area Chamber of Commerce
Berthoud Historical Society
Berthoud Area Transportation Service (BATS)
CDOT map of the Town of Berthoud

Towns in Larimer County, Colorado
Towns in Weld County, Colorado
Towns in Colorado